Hadiza Nuhu OON (born 23 August 1965) is a senior lecturer in the Department of Pharmacognosy and Drug Development at Ahmadu Bello University. She is also an herbal medicine practitioner. Nuhu is an associate professor of pharmacy.

Early life and education
Born in Kano State on 23 August 1965. She holds a PhD in pharmacognosy from Ahmadu Bello University, Zaria and a certificate in information technology from Newcastle College, UK.

HERB 25
In 2009, her 12 years of research produced Herb 25, an antimalarial medication which she describes as an enhanced ethnomedical preparation from a screened combination of herbs that have been used in Nigeria traditionally to treat malaria. Herb 25 is an anti-malaria drug to treat Chloroquine-resistant malaria and is registered by NAFDAC. It dispensed in tea bags. It will be the first time a University in Nigeria will successfully produce such a drug.

References

People from Kano State
1965 births
Living people
Academic staff of Ahmadu Bello University
Pharmacognosists
Herbalists
Officers of the Order of the Niger